SETTY BALIJA / SETTI BALIJA In Rayalaseema 

The Setty Balija is a subgroup of the Balija . This community identifies itself as Setty Balija in Rayalaseema.This caste occupation is Trading.

The setti balija Ramana royals These setty balijas are also known as Balija setty. These people took up trade and traded across countries. setti balijas are present all over greater Rayalaseema, Telangana, Tamilnadu, karnataka, and Kerala.

This caste had its history from long centuries of ancient india. However, The balija group which holds title shetty,shettkar,shettyappa is not same as of setti which widely used among karnataka, andhra pradhesh, telangana, tamil nadu and kerala. The balija(Veerashaiva) mainly in south karnataka region, who hold shetty are of the royal class who claim to be warrior-merchants.So, balijas who have shetty is different from settibalija(chettu-balija).

Coastal Andhra setti balija

The Settibalija live in the East and West Godavari districts of Andhra Pradesh

There is reason how this godavari setti balijas got their name

One rich land lord and merchant of ediga caste Dommeti venkata reddy changed the caste tittle of Idiga ( Goud ) to setti Balija in 1920's by conducting a meeting in bodaskur.

Setti is corrupted word for chettu meaning tree and balija means trading and overall meaning is people who climb tree extract toddy and trade them are called chettu balija but later on their caste name is settled as settibalija wrongly

References

Social groups of Andhra Pradesh